Camouflage is a method of avoiding detection by mimicking the surrounding environment.

Camouflage may also refer to:

Film and television
 Camouflage (1944 film), an American animated short film
 Camouflage (1977 film), a Polish film
 Camouflage (game show), a 1961–1962 American TV show, revived in 1980
 Camouflage (2007 game show), an American TV word game show

Psychology 

 Masking (camouflaging) one's behavior, personality, or emotions to conform to societal pressures or norms
 Autistic masking (camouflaging), masking in autistic people

Music 
 Camouflage (band), a German synthpop band

Albums
 Camouflage (Acoustic Ladyland album) (2004)
 Camouflage (Lara Fabian album) (2017)
 Camouflage (Merzbow album) (2009)
 Camouflage (Rod Stewart album) (1984)
 Camouflage (Rufus album) (1981)
 Camouflage (Sonny Condell album) (1977)

Songs
 "Camouflage" (Brad Paisley song) (2011)
 "Camouflage" (Stan Ridgway song) (1986)
 "Camouflage" (Chris Sievey song) (1983)
 "Camouflage", by Brandy from Human (2008)
 "Camouflage", by Jess Moskaluke from Past the Past (2017)
 "Camouflage", by Mariah Carey from Me. I Am Mariah... The Elusive Chanteuse (2014)
 "Camouflage", by Mr and Mrs Smith and Mr Drake from Mr and Mrs Smith and Mr Drake (1984)
 "Camouflage", by Third Eye Blind from Blue (1999)
 "Camouflage", by Selena Gomez from Revival (2015)

Other media 
 Camouflage (novel), a novel by Joe Haldeman

See also 
 Aircraft camouflage
 Camoflauge (1981–2003), American rapper
 :Category:Camouflage patterns
 Military camouflage of uniforms, vehicles or other equipment
 Ship camouflage